Zopun (also, Zupun) is a village and municipality in the Jalilabad Rayon of Azerbaijan.  It has a population of 968.

References 

Populated places in Jalilabad District (Azerbaijan)